Television has a long history in Ukraine, where regular television broadcasting started during the Soviet years in 1951. However the first ever TV broadcast took place on 1 February 1939 in Kyiv. Since then TV broadcasting has expanded, particularly after the fall of Communism in 1989, and now there are many different channels and groups in the Ukrainian TV market.

History 
The first official broadcast took place in Kyiv on 1 February 1939. It was 40 minutes long and showed the portrait of Sergo Ordzhonikidze. After World War II, on 6 November 1951, a Kyiv tele-centre made a debut with a live broadcast of the patriotic movie "The Great Glow". The next day the telecentre went on the air again celebrating the 34th anniversary of the October Revolution with a special live broadcast.

On 1 May 1952, a concert went on air (shot in the small and only pavilion of the telecentre known as "Studio B") of Ukrainian singers, soloists of the Kyiv Taras Shevchenko Opera Theater. The anchorwoman of the concert was the Kyiv Telecentre's first announcer – Novella Serapionova. In 1953, the construction of the building of the Kyiv Telecentre on Khreshchatyk was completed, right after the finishing of the Moscow and Leningrad Telecentres. Regular programs started to go on air in 1956. Until that year, the Telecentre went on air twice a day showing feature films or documentaries. Live broadcasting was the only form of broadcasting. Videotaped productions became the usual form in the mid-1960s.

The first regular national channel began airing on January 20, 1965, under the name UT-1 (Ukrainian television-1, today UA:First, while on March 6, 1972, a second channel, UT-2, signed on, making the UT network a republic service. In 1983, construction began on new broadcasting studios at 42 Melnyk Street, which opened after the fall of the Soviet Union in 1993.

After the Orange Revolution, Ukrainian television became more free. In February 2009 the National Council for Television and Radio Broadcasting claimed that "political pressure on mass media increased in recent times through amending laws and other normative acts to strengthen influence on mass media and regulatory bodies in this sphere".

As of January 2009, Ukrainian Prime Minister, Yulia Tymoshenko refused to appear in Inter TV-programmes "until journalists, management and owners of the TV channel stop destroying the freedom of speech and until they remember the essence of their profession - honesty, objectiveness, and unbiased stand".

In early March 2014, Ukraine-based TV channels were removed in Crimea ahead of the Russian annexation referendum. Later that month, the Ukrainian National Council for TV and Radio Broadcasting ordered measures against some Russian TV channels accused of broadcasting misleading information about Ukraine. In February 2015 the law "On protection information television and radio space of Ukraine," banned the showing (on Ukrainian television) of "audiovisual works" that contain "popularization, propaganda, propaganda, any action of law enforcement agencies, armed forces, other military, military or security forces of an invader" was enacted. One year later Russian productions (on Ukrainian television) had decreased by 300 to 400 percent. 15 more Russian TV channels were banned in March 2016.

According to the Decree of the Cabinet of Ministers of Ukraine No.509 dated June 13, 2018, analogue broadcasting was disconnected on the territory of the Kirvograd region and Kyiv from July 31, 2018. The date of the switch-off of analogue broadcasting on the rest of Ukraine is August 31, 2018

A Research & Branding Group February 2021 poll found that for the first time Ukrainians preferred the Internet as their primary news source instead of television (51% preferred the Internet and 41% TV).

Digital television 
In 2007 and 2008, experimental DVB-T broadcasts of few channels started in Kyiv and Odesa. Those turned out to be successful. Yet the DTT National Program is not approved by the government, thus the process is stuck. Because there are two versions of the program submitted: from the Ministry of Transport and Communications as well as from the State Committee of Television and Radio, there is no particular progress in 2008.

On 26 November 2008, the National Program of the Ministry was approved, but the final version and the public announcement of this fact is still on hold. Current version of the program does not take into notice any kind of Government financing, and the budget is to be private only, which will highly affect the TV industry and commercial broadcasters.

Besides there are 3rd parties, such as Television Industry Committee and National Association of Broadcasters which represent the communities of National and regional broadcasters respectively. Both organizations help the switchover not to affect the business of over 20 National and over 150 regional broadcasters.

The International Forum 'Digital Broadcasting in Ukraine' is the annual event that takes place in Kyiv, Ukraine. Its mission is to gather the most of international consultants and Ukrainian specialists to solve industry's problems in the DTT field. In 2008 the 2nd International Forum took place in Kyiv also. BBC, Deloitte and the Ministry of Communications of Finland representatives share the vision of possible plan of DTT implementation in Ukraine, delivering the best experiences from UK, Finland, France and US. Still none was taken into notice yet. It is now confirmed that Ukraine's national terrestrial TV network, which is scheduled to be launched in September 2011, will use the DVB-T2 standard for all four nationwide FTA multiplexes, for both SD and HD broadcasts. Before settling for DVB-T2, Ukraine was testing both DVB-T/MPEG-2 and DVB-T/MPEG-4 options, and some experimental transmitters operating in those standards are still alive.

Other technologies 
Commercial MMDS digital TV services work in Kyiv and some other cities.

DVB-C services delivering premium channels (in addition to standard analogue channels) launched in cable networks of Kyiv, Odesa, Kremenchuk, Poltava, Donetsk and some other cities.

Broadcasting 
As of February 2019, television broadcasting in Ukraine is available in a colour digital format, via:

digital TV
satellite TV
 cable television (Volia, regional operators)
 online services and IPTV (the most famous ones are Divan TV, Sweet TV, MEGOGO, Handy TV)

There is a choice between several free-to-air commercial broadcasters as well as the public broadcaster, the Suspilne. In addition to its metropolitan asset, Pershyi and an art station, Suspline Kultura, the Suspilne also owns regional stations in all regions of Ukraine.  A national parliamentary channel, Rada, is available too.

Commercial television is dominated by three major broadcasters: 1+1 media, StarLightMedia and Inter Media Group, which is the smallest Ukrainian major broadcaster. One of the main Ukrainian news channels, Channel 5, belongs to a former president of Ukraine, Petro Poroshenko.

Regional television in Ukraine consists primarily of independently owned networks not affiliated with major broadcasters in each region.

Subscription television consists of various providers. The largest providers are Kyivstar, Viasat and Volia. In remote areas, there are many small independent providers that provide either satellite or cable television services.

Community television launched in mid-2010s to broadcast Euromaidan protests. As of 2019, the sector is represented by Hromadske.tv which is an Internet television station.

List of channels

Terrestrial channels

Satellite and cable 
 English Club TV
 Music Box UA
 8 channel
 Bigudi
 EU Music
 4ever Music
 BoutiqueTV
 Eko-TV
 Milady Television
 Malyatko TV
 Pershyi Avtomobilny Channel
 Pershyi Dilovyi Channel
 Telekanal 24
 CHP.Info
 Nadiya (Hope Channel Ukraine)
 Sonce TV
 PORT-MONE TV
 CNL Ukraine
 Discovery Channel Ukraine
 TLC Ukraine
 National Geographic Channel Ukraine
 Da Vinci Learning Ukraine
 Deutsche Welle

Local 
 Kyiv TV
 Typovyi Kyiv
 Lviv-TV
 Black Sea TV
 ATR
 Lale
 Glas TV Odessa

International 
 1+1 International
 Inter+
 FreeDom

Criticism 

Some political and public activists  criticize Ukrainian television, mainly some national channels, for broadcasting large amounts of content of Russian origin. According to calculations of Boycott Russian Films activists, in September 2014 the amount of Russian productions on the leading Ukrainian channels ("Ukrayina", "ICTV", "NTN", "Novyi Kanal", "Inter", "STB", "2+2", "TET", "K1", "1+1") was approximately 40%. In October and December activists noticed increasing of amounts of Russian content on these channels, then Ukraine was at war with Russia.

Also activists (who? Citation needed) criticise Ukrainian channels for their language policy. In October 2014 activists have published statistics on content language on Ukrainian channels. According to them, at the time 29% was completely Ukrainian language content, 39.3% completely Russian language content, 23.5% Russian language content with Ukrainian subtitles, and 8.2% bilingual content (both Ukrainian and Russian).

2019 Ukrainian presidential election 
During the 2019 Ukrainian presidential election, various Ukrainian television channels supported a candidate for President of Ukraine.

Five groups supported Poroshenko:

Petro Poroshenko's Channel 5 and Pryamiy supported Poroshenko and were very critical of Volodymyr Zelenskyy and Yulia Tymoshenko.

Dmytro Firtash's very powerful Inter supported Yuriy Boyko and Poroshenko.

Rinat Akhmetov's TRK Ukraina, which is owned by Akhmetov's System Capital Management Holdings, supported Poroshenko, Oleh Lyashko, and Oleksandr Vilkul. Akhmetov's Opposition Bloc nominated Vilkul.

Viktor Medvedchuk's Channel 112 and Yevheniy Murayev's NewsOne supported Poroshenko, Lyashko, and Boyko. Medvedchuk's Opposition Platform — For Life nominated Boyko. The godfather of Medvedchuk's daughter is Vladimir Putin.

Petro Dyminskyi's ZIK supported Poroshenko's allies allowing them to explain their story while they were under investigation.

Three TV groups were very critical of Poroshenko:

Ihor Kolomoisky's 1+1 media group supported Volodymyr Zelenskyy. Kolomoisky and Zelenskyy are business partners.

Andriy Sadovyi's Channel 24, supported Anatoliy Hrytsenko and opposed Poroshenko.

Yevheniy Murayev's Nash TV supported Vilkul and was against Poroshenko but neutral to Tymoshenko and Lyashko.

Under the state-owned National Public Broadcasting Company, UA:Pershyi was critical of Poroshenko.

Victor Pinchuk's ICTV, Novyi Kanal and STB were neutral.

2022 Russian invasion of Ukraine 

The channel was made state-owned at the end of 2021. Following , the four biggest broadcasters including the TV channels 1+1, 2+2, 24 Kanal, and TRC Ukraina began broadcasting a 24/7 united newscast called United News that is produced in turn by the various channels and amended with official information by governmental agencies to "objectively and promptly provide comprehensive information from different regions of the country 24/7".

See also 
Television in the Soviet Union

References

Bibliography 
 Wilson,A. Virtual Politics - Faking Democracy in the Post-Soviet World. "Yale University Press", 2005.

External links 
 History of television in Ukraine and the Ukrainian Channel One

 
Television channels

Ukrainian entertainment-related lists